Jacob Schueler (November 20, 1835 - April 15, 1918) was a German-American businessman and confectionary owner, best known for co-founding the Golden Brewery, today known as Coors Brewing Company in 1873.

Early life and education 
Jacob Schueler was born Jakob Schüler on November 20, 1835 in Kiedrich, Hesse, Prussia to Peter and Maria Anna (née Roos) Schüler. He was raised in a Catholic family and emigrated to America aged 15 in 1850 with the trade of baker.

Career 

He arrived in Denver, Colorado as one of the Pikes Peakers in 1861.  He soon went to serve in the American Civil War and returned. In 1862, he partnered with Adolph Schinner, a fellow German immigrant, establishing one of Denver's oldest confectionary/bakery. He continued to run this business until 1875. 

In 1873, he teamed with fellow German immigrant Adolph Coors, investing $18,000 to Coors $2000, to start the Golden Brewery (initially operating as Schueler & Coors), now known as Coors Brewery, at Golden, Colorado. In 1880, Coors had made enough money to repay his partner's interest, and Schueler sold out to him.  In 1889, Schueler went into business with Morris Stackder in Aspen, building the Schueler-Stackder Concentrating mill.  In 1897, Schueler became famous for Rocky Mountain spring water in his own right, running the Ute Chief Mineral Springs bottling works at Manitou Springs, Colorado by the early 20th Century. After a great fire that burnt the bottling plant, the business was never the same. He continued to work for this company until his death.

Family

Schueler married Stephanie Fannie Vinot (1845-1926), who was born in Villafans in the Franche-Comté region of France, and emigrated to the US with her parents as a child, in 1867. They had five children;

 Augustine (1870 - February 10, 1951)
 Rudolph (1872 - December 26, 1952)
 William (1875 - June 23, 1959) 
 Frederick Fred (1886 - August 1960) 

Jacob Schueler died in Colorado Springs in 1918, and is buried at Denver's Riverside Cemetery. Most of the Schueler family was laid to rest in a Denver cemetery, however Fred is buried with his wife Else (Wright) Schueler in Colorado Springs. There is only one descendant from the family, David Haskin (b. 1949), who resides in Denver, Colorado and is the Chief of Rampart Research & Rescue in Adams County, Colorado.

Literature 

 Janet Jewell; Returned From Oblivion - The Story of Jacob Schueler; 2013

See also
 Manitou Mineral Springs

References

1835 births
German emigrants to the United States
Businesspeople from Denver
1918 deaths
People from Manitou Springs, Colorado
19th-century American businesspeople